The Criminal Law (Amendment) Act, 2013 (Nirbhaya Act) is an Indian legislation passed by the Lok Sabha on 19 March 2013, and by the Rajya Sabha on 21 March 2013, which provides for amendment of Indian Penal Code, Indian Evidence Act, and Code of Criminal Procedure, 1973 on laws related to sexual offences. The Bill received Presidential assent on 2 April 2013 and was deemed to be effective from 3 February 2013. It was originally an Ordinance promulgated by the President of India, Pranab Mukherjee, on 3 February 2013, in light of the protests in the 2012 Delhi gang rape case.

Background

On 16 December 2012  a female physiotherapy intern was beaten and gang raped in Delhi. She died from her injuries thirteen days later, despite receiving treatment in India and Singapore. The incident generated international coverage and was condemned by the United Nations Entity for Gender Equality and the Empowerment of Women, who called on the Government of India and the Government of Delhi "to do everything in their power to take up radical reforms, ensure justice and reach out with robust public services to make women’s lives more safe and secure". Public protests took place in Delhi, where thousands of protesters clashed with security forces. Similar protests took place in major cities throughout the country.

Six days after the incident, on 22 December 2012, the central government appointed a judicial committee headed by J. S. Verma, a former Judge of Supreme Court, to suggest amendments to criminal law to sternly deal with sexual assault cases. The committee, which also included retired judge Leila Seth and leading advocate Gopal Subramaniam, was given a month to submit its report. The Committee submitted its report within 29 days, on 23 January 2013, supposedly after considering the 80,000 suggestions and petitions received by them during that same period from the public in general and particularly from jurists, lawyers, NGOs and women's groups. The report indicated that failures on the part of the Government and Police were the root cause behind crimes against women. Major suggestions of the report included the need to review AFSPA in conflict areas, maximum punishment for rape as life imprisonment and not death penalty, clear ambiguity over control of Delhi Police etc.

The Cabinet Ministers on 1 February 2013 approved for bringing an ordinance, for giving effect to the changes in law as suggested by the Verma Committee Report.  According to former Minister of Law and Justice, Ashwani Kumar, 90 percent of the suggestions given by the Verma Committee Report have been incorporated into the Ordinance. The ordinance was subsequently replaced by a Bill with numerous changes, which was passed by the Lok Sabha on 19 March 2013.

The Criminal Law (Amendment) Ordinance, 2013

New offences
This new Act has expressly recognised certain acts as offences which were dealt under related laws. These new offences like, acid attack, sexual harassment, voyeurism, stalking have been incorporated into the Indian Penal Code:

Changes in law
Section 370 of Indian Penal Code (IPC) has been substituted with new sections, 370 and 370A which deals with trafficking of person for exploitation. If a  person (a) recruits, (b) transports, (c) harbours, (d) transfers, or (e) receives, a person, by using threats, or force, or coercion, or abduction, or fraud, or deception, or by abuse of power, or inducement for exploitation including prostitution, slavery, forced organ removal, etc. will be punished with imprisonment ranging from at least 7 years to  imprisonment for the remainder of that person's natural life depending on the number or category of persons trafficked. Employment of a trafficked person will attract penal provision as well.

The most important change that has been made is the change in definition of rape under IPC. Although the Ordinance sought to change the word rape to sexual assault, in the Act the word 'rape' has been retained in Section 375, and was extended to include acts in addition to vaginal penetration. The definition is broadly worded with acts like penetration of  penis into the vagina, urethra, anus or mouth;  or any object or any part of body to any extent, into the vagina, urethra or  anus of another  woman or making another person do so; to apply mouth or touching private parts constitutes the offence of sexual assault. The section has also clarified that penetration means "penetration to any extent", and lack of physical resistance is immaterial for constituting an offence. Except in certain aggravated situations the punishment will be imprisonment not less than seven years but which may extend to imprisonment for life, and shall also be liable to fine. In aggravated situations, punishment will be rigorous imprisonment for a term which shall not be less than ten years but which may extend to imprisonment for life, and shall also be liable to fine.

A new section, 376A has been added which states that if a person committing the offence of sexual assault, "inflicts an injury which causes the death of the person or causes the person to be in a persistent vegetative state, shall be punished with rigorous imprisonment for a term which shall not be less than twenty years, but which may extend to imprisonment for life, which shall mean the remainder of that person’s natural life, or with death." In case of "gang rape", persons involved regardless of their gender shall be punished with  rigorous imprisonment  for a term which  shall  not be less  than twenty  years, but which  may extend to life and shall pay compensation to the victim which shall be reasonable  to meet  the medical expenses and rehabilitation of the victim. The age of consent in India has been increased to 18 years, which means any sexual activity irrespective of presence of consent with a woman below the age of 18 will constitute statutory rape.

Certain changes has been introduced in the CrPC and Evidence Act, like the process of recording the statement of the victim has been made more victim friendly and easy but the two critical changes are: 
1. the 'character of the victim' is now rendered totally irrelevant, and
2. there is now a presumption of 'no consent' in a case where sexual intercourse is proved and the victim states in the court that she did not consent.

Criticisms
The law has been severely criticized for being gender biased and giving women the legal authority to commit exactly the same crimes (against which they seek protection) against men with impunity. The Criminal Law (Amendment) Ordinance, 2013 has been strongly criticised by several human rights and women's rights organisations for not including certain suggestions recommended by the Verma Committee Report like, marital rape, reduction of age of consent, amending Armed Forces (Special Powers) Act so that no sanction is needed for prosecuting an armed force personnel accused of a crime against woman. The Government of India, replied that it has not rejected the suggestions fully, but changes can be made after proper discussion.

The Criminal Law (Amendment) Act, 2013
The Bill was passed by the Lok Sabha on 19 March 2013, and by the Rajya Sabha on 21 March 2013, making certain changes from the provisions in the Ordinance. The Bill received Presidential assent on 2 April 2013 and came into force retrospectively from 3 February 2013. The changes made in the Act incomparison with the Ordinance is listed as follows:

References

External links
 Criminal Law (Amendment) Ordinance, 2013
 Criminal Law (Amendment) Act, 2013

Indian criminal law
Sex laws in India
2013 in India
2013 in law
Acts of the Parliament of India 2013